Stephno Gwandu Huche (born 15 November 1990) is a Tanzanian long distance runner. He competed in the men's marathon at the 2017 World Championships in Athletics, placing 38th with a time of 2:20:05. In 2019, he competed in the men's marathon at the 2019 World Athletics Championships held in Doha, Qatar. He did not finish his race.

References

External links

1990 births
Living people
Tanzanian male long-distance runners
Tanzanian male marathon runners
World Athletics Championships athletes for Tanzania
Place of birth missing (living people)